Thomas Pengelly may refer to:

 Thomas Pengelly (merchant) (died 1696), London merchant with whom Richard Cromwell lodged
 Sir Thomas Pengelly (judge) (1675–1730), son of the above, judge and Member of Parliament for Cockermouth, Cumberland

See also
Pengelly (surname)